Greeniopsis is a genus of flowering plants in the family Rubiaceae. The genus is endemic to the Philippines.

Species
Greeniopsis discolor 
Greeniopsis euphlebia 
Greeniopsis megalantha 
Greeniopsis multiflora 
Greeniopsis pubescens 
Greeniopsis sibuyanensis

References

Rubiaceae genera
Aleisanthieae
Taxa named by Elmer Drew Merrill